This is a list of the best selling singles, albums and as according to IRMA. Further listings can be found here.

Top-selling singles
"Someone like You" – Adele
"Lipstick" – Jedward
"We Found Love" – Rihanna featuring Calvin Harris
"Party Rock Anthem" – LMFAO featuring Lauren Bennett & GoonRock
"Cannonball" – Little Mix
"On the Floor" – Jennifer Lopez featuring Pitbull
"Moves like Jagger" – Maroon 5 featuring Christina Aguilera
"Jar of Hearts" – Christina Perri
"Give Me Everything" – Pitbull featuring Ne-Yo, Afrojack & Nayer
"Price Tag" – Jessie J featuring B.o.B

Top-selling albums
21 – Adele
Christmas – Michael Bublé
19 – Adele
Doo-Wops & Hooligans – Bruno Mars
Loud – Rihanna
Talk That Talk – Rihanna
Greatest Hits - Westlife
Up All Night – One Direction
Mylo Xyloto - Coldplay
Mayhem - Imelda May

Notes:
 *Compilation albums are not included.

References 

2011 in Irish music
2011
Ireland top sellers